Edvinsson is a surname of Swedish origin. Notable people with the surname include:

Jan-Åke Edvinsson (1941–2022), Swedish ice hockey administrator
Leif Edvinsson (born 1946), Swedish organizational theorist
Simon Edvinsson (born 2003), Swedish ice hockey player

Swedish-language surnames
Patronymic surnames